Stone Stadium may refer to:

 Eugene E. Stone III Stadium (Columbia, South Carolina), the soccer stadium for the University of South Carolina Gamecocks
 Eugene E. Stone III Stadium (Greenville, South Carolina), the soccer stadium for the Furman University Paladins